

138001–138100 

|-id=016
| 138016 Kerribeisser ||  || Kerri B. Beisser (born 1974) is a project manager at the Johns Hopkins University Applied Physics Laboratory, and served as the Education and Public Outreach Lead for the New Horizons Mission to Pluto. || 
|}

138101–138200 

|-bgcolor=#f2f2f2
| colspan=4 align=center | 
|}

138201–138300 

|-id=221
| 138221 Baldry ||  || Ivan Baldry (born 1971), British astronomer with the Sloan Digital Sky Survey who works on the color bimodality of galaxies || 
|}

138301–138400 

|-bgcolor=#f2f2f2
| colspan=4 align=center | 
|}

138401–138500 

|-id=445
| 138445 Westenburger ||  || Carl-Heinz Westenburger (1924–2008), German painter, printmaker and conservationist || 
|}

138501–138600 

|-bgcolor=#f2f2f2
| colspan=4 align=center | 
|}

138601–138700 

|-bgcolor=#f2f2f2
| colspan=4 align=center | 
|}

138701–138800 

|-bgcolor=#f2f2f2
| colspan=4 align=center | 
|}

138801–138900 

|-bgcolor=#f2f2f2
| colspan=4 align=center | 
|}

138901–139000 

|-id=979
| 138979 Černice ||  || The small Czech village of Černice, located in the South Bohemian Region above the Vltava river || 
|}

References 

138001-139000